Madame Bovary ( (The Sins of Madame Bovary), Play the Game or Leave the Bed''') is a 1969 Italian-West German historical erotic drama film directed by Hans Schott-Schöbinger and starring Edwige Fenech, Gerhard Riedmann and Franco Ressel. It is based on Gustave Flaubert's 1857 novel Madame Bovary, although the film cuts out the book's portrayal of her early life and focuses more heavily on her sexual relationships.

In nineteenth century France a provincial Doctor's wife harbours ambitions to rise in the world, but finds herself in a compromising situation following a string of love affairs.

Plot summary

Cast
 Edwige Fenech as Emma Bovary  
 Gerhard Riedmann as Dr. Charles Bovary  
 Franco Ressel as Adolphe Lheureus  
 Peter Carsten as Rudolf Boulanger  
 Gianni Dei as Leon Dupuis  
 Rossana Rovere 
 Franco Borelli as Vicomte Gaston Fresnaye  
 Patrizia Adiutori as Brigitte, die Nymphe  
 Maria Pia Conte as Felicitas  
 Edda Ferronao as Anastasia  
 Luigi Bonos as Herzog von Artois  
 Jimmy Piazza as Justin  
 Poldi Waraschitz as Butler 
 Manja Golec as Madeleine

 References 

 Bibliography 
 Goble, Alan. The Complete Index to Literary Sources in Film''. Walter de Gruyter, 1999.

External links 
 
 

1969 films
1960s erotic drama films
1960s historical drama films
German erotic drama films
Italian erotic drama films
German historical drama films
Italian historical drama films
West German films
1960s German-language films
Films based on Madame Bovary
Films set in France
Films set in the 19th century
Films about infidelity
Films produced by Luciano Martino
1969 drama films
1960s Italian films
1960s German films